No World (stylized as no world) is the debut studio album by American electronic music duo Inc. No World, released on February 19, 2013 through 4AD. "The Place", a single from the album was featured in the Grand Theft Auto V soundtrack.

Track listing

Personnel
 Andrew Aged – vocals, production
 Daniel Aged – vocals, production

References

2013 debut albums
4AD albums